Racial whitening, or "whitening" (branqueamento), is an ideology that was widely accepted in Brazil between 1889 and 1914, as the solution to the "Negro problem". However, racial whitening specific to Brazil also encompasses the perception of individuals as being white in relation to their position in the class system.  

Supporters of the Whitening ideology believed that the Negro race would advance culturally and genetically, or even disappear totally, within several generations of mixed breeding between white people and black people. This ideology gained its support from two scientific racism beliefs that were prominent during this time. One being Social Darwinism, which applied Darwin's theory of natural selection to a society or race, and the other being Aryanism, the belief that the white "Aryan" race was superior to all other cultures. By combining these two ideas, the white elites of the time believed that because "white" blood was superior, it would inevitably "whiten" the inferior races' blood.

Use of the whitening ideology
The actual use of the Whitening ideology seems to be particular to Brazil, and was not seen in Europe or the United States. Many Europeans believed that the mixing of races would produce degenerate offspring and they feared mixing could become a threat to the white race. In the United States, a barrier between black people and white people was formed by segregation, which forbade the mixing of the two races. In the 1910s and 1920s, many states in the Southern United States passed the "one drop rule", which classified a person with any African ancestry, no matter how small or remote, as black.

Brazil on the other hand did not have the barrier of segregation, and the Portuguese were more accepting of miscegenation. Brazil was also already a multicultural society that already had a mixed-class. When scientific racist beliefs and ideas became more prominent in the 1850s, Brazil's society felt they needed to find their place in the social order by solving their problem with the supposedly inferior races. Because they already were a multicultural society, the Whitening ideology was a perfect solution. Most Brazilians thought this approach was a far better one than what the United States had done. A Brazilian statesman compared the United States and Brazil by saying,

Result of Brazil's whitening
Around the late 1920s, scientific racism gave way to environmentalist theories. Gilberto Freyre, a student of anthropologist Franz Boas, was a prominent figure of the conversion. Gilberto Freyre praised interracial partnerships and mating that occurred among the Brazilian population, because they popularized the notion that Brazil was a racial democracy. Rather than seeing interracial mating as an attempt to whiten blood, he saw it as the foundation of Brazilian culture, interpreting it as evidence that Brazil lacked racial relations conflict.

Perception of whiteness in Brazil 

Whitening in Brazil is a sociological term to explain the change in perception of one's race as a black or mixed race person rises in the class structure of Brazil. Racial whitening in Brazil is a social concept that is deeply rooted in the history of the nation.  Similar to that of the United States, Brazil experienced massive colonization by Europeans and importation of Africans in the 18th and 19th century.  This type of political and social climate inherently represses a group of people while one group dominated the other.  In the case of Brazil, the white man rose to the top of the social ladder, which left the African slaves and the future Afro-Brazilians repressed for generations to come.

Whiteness in Brazil is often defined at the intersection between race and class.  In Brazil, one's racial classification is not only dependent on skin color, but is also influenced by the perception of self and the perception from others.  Compared to the United States, race in Brazil is not often defined based on the biological make-up of a person.  As described by Omni and Winant, racial formation is "the process by which social, economic and political forces determine the content and importance of racial categories, and by which they are in turn shaped by racial meanings".  This suggests that race is defined by social forces and the individual.  In Brazil it has been said that race exists on a spectrum and can change based on a number of factors such as social class and educational attainment.

Class and education have an influence on the perceived whiteness of an individual.  The Brazilian class system is heavily influenced from the history of slavery and colonization.  This puts people who identify as white at the top of class system and those who identify as black at the bottom of the class system. Upward mobility is possible in Brazil, but very rare.  An aspect that influences the upward mobility of individuals is education.  According to Telles, greater education leads to greater whitening.  This suggests that one who achieves higher education can be perceived as whiter. Nonetheless, North American anthropologist John F. Collins has suggested that ideologies of whitening have declined markedly, at least in the northeastern state of Bahia. According to Collins, one novel aspect of this shift is not simply a supposedly novel, recent, emphasis on blackness over whitening among many Bahians, but the invocation and generalization by the end of the 20th C. of specific forms of explicitly genealogical imagination that support racial or ethnic identity.

A study was done by Chinyere K Osuji on racial boundary policing of Black-White couples in Brazil. Her study shows how race and class are intertwined in order to produce inequality among Brazilians in interracial marriages. Though the idea that interracial marriages in Brazil are used for racial whitening has disappeared since the early 1900s, many interracial couples still feel as though their partnerships are being stigmatized by outsiders. Ethnoracial boundaries continue to divide people of different racial phenotypes as a way of creating distinctions and keeping order in multi-racial societies such as Brazil. Black women are often hypersexualized,  and black men are looked down upon for having married a white woman. Whiter Brazilians engage in oppressive othering by speaking or looking at others in ways that make them feel inferior.

It is important to note that the particular deployment of the concept of racial whitening may be unique to Brazil.  Brazil's apparent flexibility in racial classification system and Brazilians' ostensibly unique interpretation of racial belonging girds this idea.

People who have made reference to whitening in Brazil
João Batista de Lacerda: Director of the Museu Nacional, wrote a paper named "Half-Breeds of Brazil". In it he describes the differences in the different races. He also predicted that by the third generation of mixed breeding there are predominantly white characteristics.
Theodore Roosevelt: After visiting Brazil in 1913 he wrote an article in Outlook magazine. In his article he talks about how the Brazilian Negro is disappearing.
Thomas Skidmore: Wrote the book Black into White which covers many of the aspects dealing with Whitening. Also gives his own theories and insights.
Samuel Alexson: Wrote a pamphlet in New York explaining whitening to the common man.

References

Racism in South America
Race in Latin America
Social history of Brazil
White nationalism in South America
Race in Brazil
White Brazilians
White culture
White nationalism in Australia
Stolen Generations
Eugenics in Australia
Interracial marriage